Acraea pseudegina is a butterfly of the family Nymphalidae, which is native to the African tropics and subtropics.

Description

In this quite variable species the uppersides of the forewings are usually smoky black, with some black spots. Fringes are black except on the inner margins of both wings where they are yellowish. The uppersides of the hindwings have brick-red colour. An irregular row of nine spots shown by transparency from the underside crosses the discal area of the wings. The underside is similar to the upperside, but there is a series of black marking on the edge of the hindwings. It is very similar to Acraea natalica qv.

Distribution
This species can be found in Senegal, Democratic Republic of the Congo, Nigeria, western Kenya, southern Ethiopia, Somalia and Angola.

Biology
The larvae feed on Passiflora and Cephalomma species.

Taxonomy
It is a member of the Acraea caecilia species group. See also Pierre & Bernaud, 2014

References

 "Acraea Fabricius, 1807" at Markku Savela's Lepidoptera and Some Other Life Forms
 BioLib
 Acraea

External links
Die Gross-Schmetterlinge der Erde 13: Die afrikanischen Tagfalter. Plate XIII 55 f
Images representing Acraea pseudegina at Bold.
 Acraea pseudegina
 Acraea pseudegina
 Papillons di Gabon

pseudegina
Butterflies described in 1852